Stephen John Wilson (born 19 September 1974 in Croydon, Greater London), is a British television presenter and author, best known for presenting CBBC and Live & Kicking in 1999 and 2000. 

Wilson currently runs the personalised gift company FromLucy&Co with his wife Lucy Tapper. He is author, along with Tapper, of the book Hedgehugs.

From 2005 until 2006, Wilson presented the CITV show Feel the Fear with Holly Willoughby.
 
He appears on ITV's daytime programme This Morning, usually reporting on gadgets.

Steve is also the founding member of the group Rocker Division, alongside his three brothers Dave, Mike and Vic.

External links

References

Living people
English television presenters
People from Croydon
1974 births